FC Shakhtyor Soligorsk (FK Shakhtsyor Salihorsk) is a Belarusian Premier League football club, playing in the city of Soligorsk (Salihorsk) .

History 
The club was founded in 1961. During Soviet era Shakhtyor Soligorsk was playing in top or second division of the Belarusian SSR league, occasionally dropping to lower tiers (Minsk Oblast league) for a short time. In 1971, Shakhtyor absorbed two other local Soligorsk teams (Khimik and Gornyak). Their best results came at the end of Soviet days, when the team finished as league runners-up twice (1988, 1990) and won the Belarusian SSR Cup three times (1985, 1986, 1988).

Since 1992, Shakhtyor has been playing in Belarusian Premier League. The team struggled through the 1990s, usually fighting against relegation. In 1997, they finished at the last place in the league, but were saved from relegation after two other Premier League clubs withdrew.

After a transitory 1998 season, since 1999, they have never finished below 6th place and became a staple European Cups participant. Shakhtyor Soligorsk became the champions of Belarus in 2005, 2020 and 2021, and were league runners-up six times (2010, 2011, 2012, 2013, 2016, 2018). They also won the Belarusian Cup three times (2004, 2014, and 2019).

Honours 
 Belarusian Premier League
 Winners (4): 2005, 2020, 2021, 2022
 Runners-up (6): 2010, 2011, 2012, 2013, 2016, 2018
 Belarusian Cup
 Winners (3): 2003–04, 2013–14, 2018–19
 Runners-up (5): 2005–06, 2007–08, 2008–09, 2014–15, 2016–17
 Belarusian Super Cup
 Winners (2): 2021, 2023
 Runners-up (4): 2015, 2016, 2020, 2022

Current squad

League and Cup history 

1 Finished last but saved from relegation due to withdrawal of two higher-placed teams.

Shakhtyor in Europe 

As of 11 August 2022.

Managers 
 Ivan Schyokin (July 1, 1997 – Dec 31, 1999)
 Yury Vyarheychyk (July 1, 2002 – May 11, 2009)
 Aleksey Vergeyenko (June 26, 2009 – Nov 23, 2009)
 Eduard Malofeyev (Nov 24, 2009 – May 13, 2010)
 Uladzimir Zhuravel (May 14, 2010 – Dec 2, 2013)
 Sergei Borovsky (Jan 9, 2014–)

References

External links 
Official Website

 
Football clubs in Belarus
Association football clubs established in 1961
Mining association football teams
1961 establishments in Belarus